The Holland cloth, or simply Holland is a plainwoven or dull-finish linen used as furniture covering or a cotton fabric made more or less opaque by a glazed or unglazed finish (the Holland finish). Originally the name was applied to any fine, plainwoven linens imported from Europe, and particularly from the Netherlands. 

Holland cloth is used for window shades, insulation, labels and tags, sign cloth, etc.

References

Dutch clothing
Textiles